Shraga Weinberg (born 25 March 1966 in Petach Tiqva) is an Israeli wheelchair tennis player.

Weinberg was born in 1966, paralyzed in his upper body. He also has bone density abnormalities, which caused him to go through many surgeries in his younger years. For his recreation and rehabilitation, he began practicing disabled sports at the Israel Sports Center for the Disabled. In 2008 he was ranked 8th in the world in wheelchair tennis.

In wheelchair tennis, Weinberg was ranked 1st in 2001 for singles' tournaments and in 2003 for couples' tournaments. In the five years prior to the 2004 Summer Paralympics, he was also ranked at the top of the Israeli chart. At the Paralympic Games he competed in singles and lost at the quarter final.

Weinberg works as an accountant, making it difficult for him to develop his tennis game. In 2007 he took part only in three international tournaments, however he continued to be ranked among the top 10 players, enabling him to qualify for the 2008 Summer Paralympics. At those games, he took silver in the mixed doubles event with Boaz Kremer. He also competed in singles, but lost in the quarterfinals to eventual bronze medalist David Wagner of the United States. At the 2012 Summer Paralympics, Weinberg and his partner, Noam Gershony, won the bronze medal in the quad doubles, beating Shota Kawano and Mitsuteru Moroishi of Japan 6–3, 6–1.

References

External links
 
 

1966 births
Living people
Israeli male tennis players
Wheelchair tennis players
Paralympic wheelchair tennis players of Israel
Paralympic silver medalists for Israel
Paralympic bronze medalists for Israel
Paralympic medalists in wheelchair tennis
Medalists at the 2008 Summer Paralympics
Medalists at the 2012 Summer Paralympics
Wheelchair tennis players at the 2004 Summer Paralympics
Wheelchair tennis players at the 2008 Summer Paralympics
Wheelchair tennis players at the 2012 Summer Paralympics
Wheelchair tennis players at the 2016 Summer Paralympics